The 2010–11 Scottish League Cup is the 65th season of Scotland's second-most prestigious football knockout competition, the Scottish League Cup, also known as the Co-operative Insurance Cup for sponsorship reasons. The competition started in July 2010 with the First Round and ended in Spring 2011 with the Final. Rangers are the current title holder, having beaten Celtic in the 2011 final.

Format
The competition is a single elimination knock-out competition. In each round, fixtures are determined by random draw. Fixtures are played to a finish, with extra time and then penalties used in the event of ties. The competition is open to all clubs in the Scottish Premier League and Scottish Football League. Clubs involved in European competitions are given a bye to the third round to avoid congestion of fixtures.

First round: The 30 teams from the previous season's Scottish Football League enter
Second round: The 15 winners of the First Round are joined by the 7 of last season's SPL sides not in Europe (Heart of Midlothian, St Johnstone, Aberdeen, Hamilton Academical, St Mirren, Kilmarnock and Falkirk) who were relegated from the SPL
Third round: The 11 winners of the Second Round are joined by the 5 SPL sides in Europe (Rangers, Celtic, Dundee United, Hibernian, Motherwell)
Quarter-finals: The 8 winners of the third round play
Semi-finals: The 4 winners of the quarter-finals play
Final: The 2 winners of the semi-finals play

Adjustments from previous editions

Club Entry Points – 
The format of the first and second rounds was adjusted for this season. Previously the club promoted into the SPL entered in the Second Round alongside the other non-European SPL sides, with the side relegated to the First Division entering in the first round alongside the other SFL sides. However, this situation has been reversed, meaning Inverness Caledonian Thistle entered the tournament in the First Round – despite being promoted to SPL; and Falkirk entered in the second round – despite being relegated.

The 2009–10 tournament had seen both such sides enter in the first round, plus 11th in the SPL – as there were 6 Scottish clubs in Europe.

Unless a Scottish side wins the Europa League or unless the country secures one of the three "Fair Play" places, there will only be 4 clubs in Europe during 2011–12. As a result, both such sides plus 2nd in the First Division entered in the second round.

Semi-Finals – 
Following discussions between the SPL and SFL, it was agreed that one or both semi-finals would take place on a weekend, and not on midweek as in previous years. This practice had been the source of criticism – as it forced fans to travel to a neutral venue for a prestigious Semi-Final on a weekday evening in January or February. The details will be confirmed after the quarter-finals.

Schedule

Fixtures and results

First round
The First round draw was conducted on 28 May 2010.

Source:

Second round
The Second round draw was conducted on 6 August 2010.

Source:

Third round
The Third round draw was conducted on 31 August 2010.

Source:

Quarter-finals
The Quarter-finals draw was conducted on 23 September 2010. Ties were played on 26 and 27 October.

Source:

Semi-finals
The Semi-finals draw was conducted on 29 October 2010.

Final

Awards
A team, player and young player were chosen by the Scottish sports press as the top performers in each round.

References

External links
 Official site
 Results Soccerway

Scottish League Cup seasons
2010–11 in Scottish football cups
Cup